This is a list of foreign ministers of Paraguay from 1846 to the present day.

1846–1855: José Falcón
1855–1862: Nicolás Vázquez
1862: Domingo Francisco Sánchez
1862–1868: José Berges
1868: Gumersindo Benítez (acting)
1868–1869: Luis Caminos
1869–1870: Serapio Machaín (acting)
1870: Bernardo Recalde (acting)
1870–1871: Miguel Palacios
1871: Carlos Loizaga
1871–1872: José Falcón
1872–1873: Gregorio Benítez Inchausti
1873–1874: José del Rosario Miranda (acting)
1874: Cándido Bareiro
1874: José Higinio Uriarte García
1874–1877: Facundo Machaín
1877: Benjamín Aceval
1877–1878: Juan Antonio Jara
1878–1880: Benjamín Aceval
1880–1886: José Segundo Decoud
1886–1887: Benjamín Aceval
1887–1888: José Segundo Decoud
1888–1890: Juan Crisóstomo Centurión
1890–1894: Venancio Víctor López
1894–1895: Héctor Velázquez
1895–1900: José Segundo Decoud
1900–1901: Fabio Queirolo
1901–1902: Juan Cancio Flecha
1902: Manuel Domínguez
1902–1903: Pedro Pablo Peña
1903: Cayetano A. Carreras
1903–1904: Antolín Irala
1904–1905: Gualberto Cardús Huerta
1905: Cecilio Báez
1905–1906: Cayetano A. Carreras (acting)
1906: Adolfo Rufo Soler
1906–1908: Cecilio Báez
1908: Eusebio Ayala
1908–1910: Manuel Gondra
1910–1911: Héctor Velázquez
1911: Cecilio Báez
1911: Teodosio González
1911: Carlos Luis Isasi
1911–1912: Antolín Irala
1912: Fulgencio Ricardo Moreno
1912: Félix Paiva
1912: Eusebio Ayala
1912–1913: Félix Paiva
1913–1918: Manuel Gondra
1918–1919: Eusebio Ayala
1919–1920: Ramón Lara Castro
1920–1921: Manuel Peña Rojas
1921–1923: Alejandro Arce
1923–1924: Rogelio Ibarra Muñoz
1924–1925: Manuel Peña Rojas
1925–1928: Enrique Bordenave
1928–1931: Gerónimo Zubizarreta
1931–1932: Raúl Casal Ribeiro
1932: Higinio Arbo
1932–1934: Justo Pastor Benítez
1935–1936: Luis Alberto Riart
1936–1937: Juan Stefanich
1937–1938: Cecilio Báez
1938–1939: Elías Ayala
1939–1940: Justo Pastor Prieto Rojas
1940: Justo Pastor Benítez
1940: Tomás Andrés Salomoni
1940–1944: Luis Andrés Argaña
1944–1946: Horacio Chiriani Cotor
1946: Antonio Alberto Taboada
1946–1947: Miguel Ángel Soler
1947: Federico Chaves
1947–1948: César Augusto Vasconsellos
1948: Domingo Montanaro
1948–1949: Juan Emiliano O'Leary (acting)
1949: Federico Chaves
1949–1952: Bernardo Ocampos
1952–1953: Ángel Florentín Peña (acting to 1953)
1953–1954: José Antonio Moreno González
1954–1956: Hipólito Sánchez Quell
1956–1976: Raúl Sapena Pastor
1975–1983: Alberto Nogués (acting for Sapena to 1976)
1983–1988: Carlos Augusto Saldívar
1988–1989: Rodney Elpidio Acevedo
1989–1990: Luis María Argaña
1990–1993: Alexis Frutos Vaesken
1993: Diógenes Martínez
1993–1996: Luis María Ramírez Boettner
1996–1998: Rubén Melgarejo Lanzoni
1998–1999: Dido Florentín Bogado
1999: Miguel Abdón Saguier
1999–2000: José Félix Fernández Estigarribia
2000–2001: Juan Esteban Aguirre Martínez
2001–2003: José Antonio Moreno Ruffinelli
2003–2006: Leila Rachid de Cowles
2006–2008: Rubén Ramírez Lezcano
2008–2009: Alejandro Hamed
2009–2011: Héctor Lacognata
2011–2012: Jorge Lara Castro
2012–2013: José Félix Fernández Estigarribia
2013–2018: Eladio Loizaga
2018–2019: Luis Castiglioni
2019–2020: Antonio Rivas Palacios
2020–2021: Federico González Franco
2020–present: Euclides Acevedo

Sources
Rulers.org – Foreign ministers L–R

Foreign
Foreign Ministers
 
1846 establishments in Paraguay